Almost Naked Animals is a Canadian animated television series produced by 9 Story Entertainment for YTV. The series was created by Noah Z. Jones, who is also the creator of the Disney Channel animated series Fish Hooks. It was based upon an art website that Jones created in 2005. The series premiered on January 7, 2011 on YTV and ended on May 22, 2013.

Premise
The cartoon is set inside a tropical resort called the Banana Cabana. All of the cabana's staff members and residents are funny animals who have shaved off their fur and wear only underclothes. An  anthropomorphic dog named Howie is the manager and leader of the cabana. Each episode follows Howie and his "misfit" crew having unusual adventures in the Banana Cabana.

Episodes

Characters

Main
 Howie (voiced by Robert Tinkler) is a pale-yellow dog and manager of the Banana Cabana. He is hyperactive, very dim witted and impulsive, he's almost always cheerful. He is also completely oblivious to his sister's evil nature.
 Octo (voiced by Howard Jerome) is an overly cautious blue octopus and the desk clerk. He is Howie's best friend.
 Bunny (voiced by Emilie-Claire Barlow) is a sometimes short-tempered yellow rabbit and activity planner with a sugary personality (subject to mood swings).
 Duck (voiced by David Berni) is a tan-colored duck who does every random job and tries anything to get it done. It was revealed in "The Sun Howie Always Wanted", and "Mini Howies" that his full name is Archibald William Nightindale Duck III. As a running gag Duck often appears during a problem with a funny non sequitur. 
 Piggy "Willberforce" Pig (voiced by Seán Cullen) is a pale pink-colored pig who is a ninja-trained master chef with a Bulgarian accent. He speaks broken English.
 Narwhal (voiced by Seán Cullen) is a self centered, periwinkle-colored narwhal that loves to sing (he is the lounge performer).
 Sloth (voiced by Linda Kash) is a peach-colored sloth and the bellhop of the Banana Cabana. She has a crush on Howie. She also does everything slowly. She moves around using her luggage cart.

Villains
 Poodle (voiced by Alyson Court) is a pink-colored poodle. Howie's evil older sister who owns a rival hotel called the Chateau Chattoo. She always tries to ruin Howie's fun and tries to take over Howie's hotel.
 Batty (voiced by Julie Lemieux) is a purple-colored bat who is Poodle's evil minion. In "Oh Brother, Who Art Thou?", Batty reveals to Howie that he is his long-lost cousin.

Recurring
 Dirk Danger (voiced by Christian Potenza) A flying squirrel who has a career (more or less) as a stuntman. He is Howie's role model.
 Radiation Rooster is the Radioactive Microwave Sales Rooster. His limbs fall off and he is very dumb. 
 Captain Fizzy is a Pirate Turtle the owner of the soft drink "Captain Fizzy's Fuzzy Orange Soda" and "Sugar" which is 99% sugar. He is a turtle. He started a few contests like the limited edition blue and green can contest and the Fuzzy Orange Happy Land contest. He has a floating factory which is a large boat. 
 Hippo (voiced by Jamie Watson) is a bluish gray-colored hippopotamus in his superhero attire.

Production
The series was produced by 9 Story Entertainment who produced it for Cartoon Network and YTV. Noah Z. Jones is the creator of the series, while Brad Ferguson is the director. Executive producers includes Vince Commisso, Steve Jarosz, and Noah Z. Jones. Other staff for the series includes Tanya Green as supervising producer, Tristan Homer as producer and Mark Satterthwaite as creative producer.

Development for the series started as early as 2006.

On October 16, 2009, Aaron H. Bynum, news editor of Animation Insider, announced that the series entered production. Vince Commisso, president and CEO of 9 Story Entertainment was pleasantly surprised and charmed for the production of Almost Naked Animals and said: "We are very excited to be commencing production on Almost Naked Animals,". "We spent a great deal of time in development, ensuring the characters, the pacing and the tone of the show was  precise. It is extremely gratifying to see our work come to fruition and the end result is this high-quality, curiously funny animated property."

Home media
Episodes of Almost Naked Animals are available for digital download through the iTunes Music Store, which are split into two volumes. Roadshow Home Entertainment released a 95-minute Region 4 DVD of the show on December 1, 2011. In 2012 NCircle Entertainment has released episodes on DVD for Canada and the US. In the UK Abbey Home Media released episodes on DVD.

Reception

Critical response
In June 2011, Almost Naked Animals was picked as one of People Magazine's top children's shows to watch in the US. Common Sense Media rated the show 3 stars out of 5, with the review stating that "The show's writing is smart enough that adults will get some laughs right alongside their kids". Despite this however, the series mostly received negative reviews.

Ratings
During the week of November 20, 2011, the show has been receiving high ratings on CITV in the UK and has been the most watched after school children's program amongst kids aged 4–9.

Awards and nominations

Other media

Toys and merchandising
The Licensing Shop has signed products in the US market for Almost Naked Animals. Freeze has secured rights for t-shirts, fashion tops and hoodies in all sizes while ABG Accessories will be making cold weather accessories, spring and summer headwear and rainwear including umbrellas and slickers for the show. In 2012 Cafepress agreed to make Almost Naked Animals plushies, water bottles, t-shirts, and more merchandise is being made.

Online game
In January 2012 it was announced that 9 Story and Game Pill were creating an Almost Naked Animals online game entitled "Cabana Craze." The game was released on September 25, 2012 and can be found at CabanaCraze.com.

References

External links

 
 
 

2010s Canadian animated television series
2010s Canadian workplace comedy television series
2011 Canadian television series debuts
2013 Canadian television series endings
Canadian children's animated comedy television series
Canadian flash animated television series
English-language television shows
YTV (Canadian TV channel) original programming
Surreal comedy television series
Television series by 9 Story Media Group
Television series by Corus Entertainment
Television series created by Noah Z. Jones
Animated television series about animals
Animated television series about dogs
Television series about vacationing
Television shows filmed in Toronto